The Maximilianeum, a palatial building in Munich, was built as the home of a gifted students' foundation but since 1949 has housed the Bavarian State Parliament. It sits grandly and as a focal point on the bank of the Isar River above Maximilian Bridge at the eastern end of Maximilianstrasse, a royal avenue dotted with Neo-Gothic palaces influenced by the English Perpendicular style.

Construction was the initiative of King Maximilian II of Bavaria in 1857, with Friedrich Bürklein the lead architect. Weight problems delayed completion until 1874, and the façade, which had been conceived as Neo-Gothic, needed to be altered; Gottfried Semper was entrusted with the adjustments, resulting in the final quasi-Renaissance appearance decorated with arches, columns, mosaics, and niches filled with busts.

The much less visible rear of the edifice has been extended in motley fashion to provide new parliamentary office space, in 1958, 1964, 1992, and again in 2012, each time with a different architectural approach.

External links

 Maximilianeum Panorama

Commercial buildings completed in 1874
Maximilianeum
Buildings and structures in Munich
Historicist architecture in Munich
German Landtag buildings
Culture in Munich
Registered historic buildings and monuments in Bavaria
1874 establishments in Bavaria